The Lake Macquarie Regional Football Facility (LMRFF) is a football facility located in Speers Point, NSW.

Developed in 2014, it consists of:
 2 full-size synthetic football fields,
 10 five-a-side football fields, 
 an administration building, 
 a 120-space vehicle parking area and associated infrastructure.

Australia Cup
LMRFF is the host for the NNSW Australia Cup Qualifying final rounds. The inaugural event at the facility was played on the weekend of 20–21 June 2015.

Newcastle Jets
On May 21 2015, it was announced that the LMRFF would become the training facility for A-League team, the Newcastle Jets. This coincided with FFA taking ownership of the club. The team had previously trained at Ray Watt Oval at the University of Newcastle.

References

External links
Project Plans

2014 establishments in Australia
Soccer venues in New South Wales
Sports venues completed in 2014
Sports venues in New South Wales